The University of Prince Edward Island (UPEI) is a public university in Charlottetown, Prince Edward Island, Canada, and the only university in the province. Founded in 1969, the enabling legislation is the University Act, R.S.P.E.I 2000.

History 
The university traces its roots back to 1804, when Lt. Governor Edmund Fanning and the Legislative Council of Prince Edward Island called for the establishment of Kent College. By 1820, the first Kent College building, known as "the National School", or James Breading's School was erected. Later succeeded by Central Academy, which received a Royal Charter in 1834.

The Colleges were renamed for the Prince of Wales in honour of the future King Edward VII in 1860. The University of Prince Edward Island also traces its roots back to its two earlier predecessor organizations, St. Dunstan's University and Prince of Wales College, founded in 1855 and 1860 respectively. The two institutions were merged in 1969 by the government of Alex Campbell as part of a campaign to integrate the Island's Roman Catholic and Protestant communities, which had previously maintained the two separate institutions of higher learning. Holland College was later created to fill the void left by the merger of Prince of Wales College into the university.
The University of Prince Edward Island is a non-denominational university established in 1969 by the amalgamation of Prince of Wales College (PWC) founded in 1834, and St. Dunstan's University (SDU) founded in 1855. The first student to enroll was Elizabeth Rollins Epperly, who would later become president. Its predecessor institutions ceased to operate although St. Dunstan's still retains its charter and the lands that were home to Prince of Wales became the campus for Holland College. UPEI is located on the former St. Dunstan's campus.

During the COVID-19 pandemic, UPEI received a $500,000 grant from the Public Health Agency of Canada's Immunization Partnership Fund to develop and implement the Island Vaccine Education Program, intended to increase uptake of COVID-19 vaccines among vulnerable families.

Legacy 
On 8 May 2004 Canada Post issued 'University of Prince Edward Island, 1804-2004' as part of the Canadian Universities series. The stamp was based on a design by Denis L'Allier and on a photograph by Guy Lavigueur. The 49¢ stamps are perforated 13.5 and were printed by Canadian Bank Note Company, Limited.

Campus 

UPEI's campus, located at the corner of Belvedere and University Avenues in Charlottetown, Prince Edward Island's capital city, is built on 134 acres (54 hectares) of land. The Confederation Trail runs alongside its eastern boundary.

Original SDU buildings in the central quadrangle have been renovated to retain integrity of their exterior aesthetic design while meeting modern standards. Main Building, built in 1854, and Dalton Hall, built between 1917 and 1919, are on the registry of Historic Places of Canada.

The War Memorial Hall (more generally known as Memorial Hall) is a landmark building on the campus of UPEI. Built as a men's residence building in 1946, Memorial Hall honours alumni who had enlisted and died in the First World War, and in the Second World War.

Over the past three decades, UPEI has experienced significant growth with many new buildings integrated into the campus, including Central Utility Building (1973), Duffy Science Centre (1967), Blanchard Hall (1973), Bernardine Hall (1968), Robertson Library (1975), Atlantic Veterinary College (1986), Chi-Wan Young Sports Centre (1990), Wanda Wyatt Dining Hall (1990), Food Technology Centre, K.C. Irving Chemistry Centre (1997), W.A. Murphy Student Centre (2002), MacLauchlan Arena (2004), Bill and Denise Andrew Hall residence facility (2006), expansions to the Atlantic Veterinary College (2007 and 2009), Regis and Joan Duffy Research Centre (2007), a research and development laboratory which is home to the National Research Council of Canada, Agriculture and Agri-Food Canada, and other partners, and Don and Marion McDougall Hall (2008). The most recent addition is the Health Sciences Building, home to the School of Nursing and Applied Human Sciences programs.

In October 2004, the UPEI administration undertook an official campus plan to improve the aesthetics of modern buildings constructed since the amalgamation which do not enhance the original SDU design, and to take overall campus aesthetics into account for future developments on and adjacent to the campus.

Organization 
The current President is Dr. Gregory Keefe, who was installed December 13, 2021. The current chancellor is Catherine Callbeck, who was installed on September 29, 2018.

Academics 
UPEI's seven faculties (arts, business, education, nursing, science, sustainable design engineering and veterinary medicine) and two schools (Mathematical & Computational Sciences and Climate Change & Adaptation) offer a wide range of programs and degrees to undergraduate, graduate and doctoral students. Co-op programs have been established in Business Administration, Computer Science, Physics, and Dietetics. The University is presently developing a Faculty of Medicine, in association with the Memorial University of Newfoundland.

Master's and Doctoral degree programs were first introduced through the Atlantic Veterinary College and, beginning in 1999, a Master of Science degree was offered through the Faculty of Science. In that same year the first students were admitted to the university's new Master of Education program. As of 2010, in addition to the MEd graduate program, the Faculty of Education offered a PhD in Educational Studies.  The university also now offers a Master of Arts in Island Studies. Recently the Faculty of Business Administration began offering an Executive Master of Business Administration degree. Since 1998, The Centre for Conflict Resolution Studies has been offering courses leading to a Certificate in Conflict Resolution Studies. The Master of Applied Health Services Research (MAHSR) program is coordinated by the Atlantic Research Training Centre (ARTC).

The Faculty of Education offers one-year (12 months) post-degree bachelor's degrees with specializations in international, adult, and indigenous education, French immersion and human resources development, a Master of Education (MEd) in leadership in learning, and a PhD in Educational Studies.

The Department of Applied Human Sciences has an accredited dietitian program. The university is accredited by a professional organization such as the Dietitians of Canada and the university's graduates may subsequently become registered dieticians.

The Faculty Development Office provides professional development courses applicable to many sectors and industries, including development programs for administrative assistants and new managers; collaboration, conflict, and communication training; and, financial management courses.

Rankings 

In Maclean's 2023 Guide to Canadian Universities, UPEI was ranked eighth in the publication's category for "primarily undergraduate" Canadian universities.

Research 
UPEI manages over $17 million in annual research expenditures. The on-campus biosciences and health research facility is used by researchers from UPEI, National Research Council (Canada), and Agriculture and Agri-Foods Canada.

UPEI houses the L.M. Montgomery Institute, founded in 1993, which promotes scholarly inquiry into the life, works, culture, and influence of the Canadian writer, L.M. Montgomery. The collection of novels, manuscripts, texts, letters, photographs, sound recordings and artifacts and other Montgomery ephemera.

UPEI joined with Dalhousie University and Memorial University of Newfoundland to form the Ocean Frontier Institute , a collaborative research initiative aimed at harnessing the vast potential of the world's oceans.

Student life

Athletics 

The UPEI Panthers have nine teams playing in the Atlantic University Sport (AUS) and the Canadian Interuniversity Sport (CIS), including men's and women's ice hockey, soccer, basketball, as well as women's field hockey and rugby union and co-ed swimming.

The UPEI campus provides its students with many athletics amenities typically found on university campuses. The CARI Complex is a public recreation facility located on the campus and includes two hockey rinks (the MacLauchlan Arena as well as a practice rink) as well as two 25-metre swimming pools (a shallow recreational wading pool, and an eight-lane competitive pool with diving boards). In 2009 UPEI inaugurated the UPEI Alumni Canada Games Place which was built in part to host the 2009 Canada Games. It consists of a "class 2" eight-lane 400-metre running track and rugby field that has spectator seating for 1,335.

Residence 
UPEI accommodates 434 students in three residences, Bill and Denise Andrew Hall, Blanchard Hall, and Bernardine Hall. Bill and Denise Andrew Hall has two-room suites with single bedrooms. In Blanchard Hall, each suite has two single bedrooms with a kitchenette and a living room. Bernardine Hall (known as "Bernie" to the students) offers suites with two double bedrooms and a shared bathroom. Although the hall is co-ed, one floor is female-only.

UPEI/SDU/PWC notable people

List of presidents 
 Ronald James Baker (1969-1978)
 Peter P.M. Meincke (1978-1985)
 Charles William John Eliot (1985-1995)
 Elizabeth Rollins Epperly (1995-1998)
 Wade MacLauchlan (1999-2011)
 Alaa Abd-El-Aziz (2011–2021)
 Gregory Keefe (2021–Present)

In 2015 each of the first five presidents were recognized as Founders of the University.

Being a long-standing university and college in the Maritime province of Prince Edward Island (called the Cradle of Confederation) UPEI/SDU/PWC have been in a position to provide education to a long list of people who have gone to notable achievements. The most well known graduate (of Prince of Wales College) is Lucy Maude Montgomery, author of "Anne of Green Gables" and other books. The most distinguished Saint Dunstan's graduate may be James Charles McGuigan, Cardinal-Priest of Santa Maria del Popolo in Rome.

Religion
 James Charles McGuigan - Cardinal; Archbishop of Toronto; Cardinal-Priest of Santa Maria del Popolo in Rome.
 Joseph Anthony O'Sullivan - Grad of Grand Séminaire de Montréal; Archbishop of Kingston, Ontario; Titular Archbishop of Maraguia
 James Morrison - Archbishop, Bishop of Antigonish, Nova Scotia; studied at the Urban College of the Congregatio de Propaganda Fide in Rome.
 James Charles McDonald - 4th Bishop of Charlottetown; Studied at Grand Séminaire de Montréal
 John T. McNeill - Theological Historian; Graduate of McGill University, University of Edinburgh, and University of Chicago

Medical
 Heather G. Morrison - Rhodes Scholar, Oxford University, Medical Doctor, Chief Public Health Officer of PEI. 
 Sir Andrew Macphail - Physician; Writer for Chicago Times; Enlisted in Canadian Army in WW I at age 50 as ambulance driver.  Knighted in 1918 for literary and military work.
 John Joseph Alban Gillis - Surgeon, Senior House Doctor at Royal Victoria Hospital, Montreal; MLA in British Columbia Legislative Assembly; Mayor of Merritt, British Columbia
 William Henry Sutherland - Physician at Royal Victoria Hospital, Montreal, for the Canadian Pacific Railway, and the Hotel Vancouver; Mayor of Revelstoke, British Columbia
 James Walter MacNeill -  Physician; First superintendent of Saskatchewan Hospital; Early developer for advanced treatments of the mentally ill
 Owen Trainor - Physician; Member of Parliament for Winnipeg Manitoba South; Died during first term in House of Commons
 Augustine A. MacDonald - Physician & Member of Legislative Assembly; Awarded Order of Canada in 1968 for providing medical care to the people of rural Prince Edward Island for more than sixty years

Business
 Frank Zakem - LLD, B.A., B.Ed., B.Com., OPEI.  businessman, politician, educator, author
 Brenton St. John - Businessman, fish factory director, farm commodity exporter; Speaker of PEI Legislative Assembly
 Henry Callbeck - Ship Builder, Businessman, Sheriff of Queens County, Governor of Prince of Wales College
 Don McDougall (baseball) - President of Labatt Brewing Company; principal in establishment of Toronto Blue Jays

Prince Edward Island Lieutenant Governor (Viceregal)
 Willibald Joseph MacDonald - 19th Lieutenant Governor (Viceregal) of PEI; Soldier in WW I and WW II
 Marion Reid - C.M.Order of Canada, OPEI Order of Prince Edward Island, 24th Lieutenant Governor (Viceregal) of PEI (and first woman Lt. Gov); Dame of Grace of The Most Venerable Order of the Hospital of Saint John of Jerusalem (Order of Saint John (chartered 1888))
 George William Howlan - 6th Lieutenant Governor (Viceregal) of PEI; Irish-born merchant and ship owner
 Augustine Colin Macdonald - 10th Lieutenant Governor (Viceregal) of PEI; also long time Member of Parliament
 Murdock MacKinnon - 11th Lieutenant Governor (Viceregal) of PEI; Farmer; PEI Commissioner of Agriculture
 Donald Alexander MacKinnon - 8th Lieutenant Governor (Viceregal) of PEI; Attorney, also grad Dalhousie School of Law
 Thomas William Lemuel Prowse - 17th Lieutenant Governor (Vicregal) of PEI; 26th Mayor of Charlottetown; President of Prowse Brother, Ltd
 Frederick Walter Hyndman - 18th Lieutenant Governor (Viceregal) of PEI; Canadian Army Major in WW II
 Frank Richard Heartz - 12th Lieutenant Governor (Viceregal) of PEI; also businessman and farmer
 Gordon Lockhart Bennett - 21st Lieutenant Governor (Viceregal) of PEI; Chemistry Professor at Prince of Wales College; Canadian Curling Hall of Fame

Prince Edward Island Premier
 Lemuel Owen - 2nd Premier of PEI; Shipbuilder, Banker; Merchant
 Sir William Wilfred Sullivan - 4th Premier of PEI; Knighted by King George V.
 Louis Henry Davies - 3rd Premier of PEI, Member of Parliament, 12th Puisne Justice of the Supreme Court of Canada, 6th Chief Justice of Canada
 Frederick Peters - 6th Premier of PEI; mother was Mary Cunard (eldest daughter of Sir Samuel Cunard)
 Donald Farquharson - 8th Premier of PEI; Member of Parliament; MLA
 Herbert James Palmer - 11th Premier of PEI; son of former colonial Premier Edward Palmer (Canadian politician).
 Aubin-Edmond Arsenault - 13th Premier of Prince Edward Island, PEI Supreme Court Judge
 Albert Charles Saunders - 16th Premier of Prince Edward Island; PEI Supreme Court Judge; elected four times as mayor of Summerside PEI
 Thane Campbell - 19th Premier of PEI, Rhodes Scholar, also grad Oxford University
 Bennett Campbell - 24th Premier of PEI
 Alexander Warburton - Also grad University of Edinburgh. PEI Member of Parliament, 7th Premier of Prince Edward Island
 James Lee - 26th Premier of PEI;  Sworn to Privy Council of Canada by Her Majesty Queen Elizabeth II.
 Keith Milligan - 29th Premier of PEI
 William J.P. MacMillan - 18th Premier of PEI; also M.D. and graduate of McGill University School of Medicine
 James David Stewart - 15th Premier of PEI
 Walter Russell Shaw - 22nd Premier of PEI; Officer of the Order of Canada; Canadian Agricultural Hall of Fame in 1980.
 John Howatt Bell - 14th Premier of PEI; PEI Member of Parliament
 John Alexander Mathieson - 12th Premier of PEI

Prince Edward Island Members Legislative Assembly
 Prosper Arsenault - Educator; Politician, Speaker of the PEI Legislative Assembly
 Cletus Dunn - MLA, Civil Servant
 Cynthia Dunsford - MLA, Squash Coach, Writer/Performer of CBC Radio comedy show "Parkdale Doris."
 Paul Connolly - Educator, Politician; Member National Parole Board in 2002, serving for seven years.
 Jamie Ballem - MLA, Businessman; founded Island Green Power Company to promote the development of wind power on the island
 Herb Dickieson - MLA, Physician, also grad Dalhousie University School of Medicine; Chief of Medical Staff at Charlottetown Community Hospital
 Doug Currie - MLA;  Head Coach and Director of Hockey Operations for the University of Prince Edward Island.
 Valerie Docherty - MLA
 Paula Biggar - MLA
 Alan Buchanan - MLA, Educational Administrator; Communication Officer with Island Telecom and later Aliant,
 Kevin MacAdam - MLA, Political Advisor
 James Warburton - MLA, Mayor of Charlottetown, Physician
 Jim Larkin - MLA; Executive with Tourism Industry Association of Canada
 George Dewar - MLA; Physician in private practice and earlier with Royal Canadian Medical Corps in WW II; member Order of Canada
 Betty Jean Brown - MLA, Nurse Practitioner; Owner of family fur farm
 David McKenna - Optometrist, businessman and politician, MLA in Legislative Assembly of Prince Edward Island

Canada national government
 Mark MacGuigan - Attorney General of Canada; Secretary of State for External Affairs in the cabinet of Prime Minister Pierre Trudeau
 Jacques Hebert - Quebec Senator to Parliament; Author Deux innocents en Chine rouge (with Pierre Trudeau)
 Mike Duffy - PEI Senator to Parliament of Canada; TV news show host; covered fall of Saigon, Vietnam
 Percy Downe - PEI Senator to Parliament of Canada;  Chief of Staff for Prime Minister Jean Chrétien
 Lorne Bonnell - PEI Senator to Parliament of Canada; Physician
 John McLean - PEI Senator to Parliament of Canada; earlier Member of Parliament; MLA; Director of several businesses, i.e., Maritime Life Insurance Co. and The Guardian newspaper
 Melvin McQuaid - PEI Member of Parliament of Canada; PEI Supreme Court Judge
 Alfred Lefurgey - PEI Member of Parliament of Canada; also grad Harvard Law
 Thomas Joseph Kickham - PEI Senator to Parliament of Canada
 James McIsaac - PEI Member of Parliament of Canada; also grad Université Laval
 Angus Alexander McLean - PEI Member of Parliament of Canada; also grad Harvard Law
 Peter Adolphus McIntyre - PEI Member of Parliament; 7th Lieutenant Governor (Viceregal) of PEI
 Joe McGuire - PEI Member of Parliament of Canada
 Shawn Murphy - PEI Member of Parliament; Attorney, Queen's Counsel
 George Henderson; PEI Member of Parliament; Shellfish Technician; Farmer, Electrical Engineer and Businessman
 Chester McLure - PEI Member of Parliament; Fox Farmer;  Honorary Lieutenant-Colonel in 1930 for the 2nd Medium Light Artillery
 Montague Aldous - Dominion Topographical Surveyor of the Northwest Territories 1877; also grad of Bowdoin College, Maine
 Thomas McMillan - political scientist and former politician, Member of Parliament; Minister of the Environment

Provincial/local governments of Canada
 David Laird - 1st Lieutenant Governor of Northwest Territories, Canada; Indian Commissioner of the Northwest Territories, Manitoba, and Keewatin
 Bob MacQuarrie - Ontario MLA
 George Washington McPhee - Saskatchewan Member of Parliament of Canada; Attorney, King's Counsel
 Robert Deschamps - Member National Assembly of Quebec; Parti Québécois member and supporter of sovereignty of Quebec
 F.H. Auld - Agricultural Scientist, Saskatchewan Deputy Minister of Agriculture, 1916–46
 Harold Lloyd Henderson - Presbyterian minister, Mayor Portage la Prairie, Manitoba; also grad McGill University
 John Salmon Lamont - PWC and Princeton University, Reeve of Assinibola, Manitoba
 John K. McInnis - Mayor of Regina, Saskatchewan
 Maurice DeLory - MLA in Nova Scotia House of Assembly; Surgeon
 Alexander Campbell - represented St. John's in the Newfoundland and Labrador House of Assembly, 1928–32;  also grad Royal College of Physicians of Edinburgh and the University of Vienna.

Arts and letters
 Lucy Maud Montgomery - Author: Anne of Green Gables, Avonlea
 Irene Gammel - Literary Historian: Baroness Elsa, Looking for Anne of Green Gables
 Sandra M. Macdonald - Chairperson National Film Board of Canada
 John Smith - Poet Laureate of PEI
 Rachna Gilmore - Children's Book Writer; 1999 Governor General's Award for Children's Literature
 Anne Compton - Poet; 2005 Governor General's Award for Poetry; 2012 awarded Queen Elizabeth II Diamond Jubilee Medal
 Tyler Shaw - Singer; 2012 Billboard Canada Adult Contemporary # 5 song "Kiss Goodnight." Song was certified Gold by Music Canada in 2013.
 James Jeffrey Roche - Writer, American Consul in Switzerland; Editor of Boston Pilot newspaper

Education
 John Angus Weir - 4th President of Wilfrid Laurier University, Waterloo, Ontario; also grad University of Notre Dame
 William Christopher Macdonald - 4th Chancellor of McGill University; founder MacDonald & Brothers tobacco company
 Elizabeth Rollins Epperly - Victorian Scholar; grad UPEI and University of London; President of UPEI, 1995–98
 Eddie Gardner - Elder-in-Residence University of the Fraser Valley; founder Open-Net Salmon Boycott
 Marin Gallant - Educator, MLA, Inspector for PEI French Schools
 William Edwin Cameron - first Saint Dunstan's Rhodes Scholar, SDU Class of 1904
 Scott MacEachern - Professor of Archaeology and Anthropology at Duke Kunshan University, China, an expert in African archaeology.
 Kathy Martin - Professor in the Faculty of Forestry at the University of British Columbia and a senior research scientist with Environment and Climate Change Canada
 Tim Carroll - Assistant Professor of History at Saint Francis Xavier University & UPEI; MLA in Legislative Assembly of Prince Edward Island

Philanthropist
 Jean-Louis Lévesque - Philanthropist, entrepreneur, racehorse owner

Prince Edward Island law/legal
 Wayne Cheverie - PEI Supreme Court Judge
 Gerard Mitchell - Chief Justice PEI Supreme Court
 Charles St. Clair Trainor - Chief Justice PEI Supreme Court, King's Counsel
 Gavan Duffy - Judge of the Prince Edward Island County Court, sitting in Queens County;  King's Counsel; Grand Master Knights of Columbus
 Reginald Bell - PEI Supreme Court Judge
 George McMahon - PEI Supreme Court Judge

Other Canada law/legal
 Sir James Hyndman - Alberta Supreme Court Judge;  Inducted as a Commander of the Order of the British Empire in 1948.
 J. Greg Peters - Superintendent of the Royal Canadian Mounted Police and Usher of the Black Rod of the Senate of Canada.

U.S. government
 Jacob Gould Schurman - US Ambassador to Germany; President Cornell University
 Cyrus S. Ching - U.S. federal administrator, US Department of Labor Hall of Honor
 James U. Campbell - 25th Chief Justice Oregon Supreme Court, USA; U.S. Lieutenant in Philippines during Spanish–American War
 Burpee L. Steeves - 9th Lieutenant Governor of Idaho; also grad Willamette University, Oregon

Prince Edward Island local government
 Ian MacDonald - 43rd Mayor of Charlottetown; Known as "Tex"
 William S. Stewart - Mayor of Charlottetown, 1932–34; MLA; Admiralty Court Judge
 Philip Brown - Mayor of Charlottetown, as of January 2019; teacher and businessman

Military
 Ralph McInerney - World War I Pilot in Royal Flying Corps; Represented the city of Saint John, New Brunswick in the Legislative Assembly of New Brunswick from 1939 to 1948.
 Roger Soloman - Lieutenant Royal Canadian Navy; Tourist cottages business owner on Brudenell River, PEI; High School Principal
 Keith Brown - Scottish politician; Deputy Leader of the Scottish National Party; Royal Marines in Falklands War

Athletics
 Scott Morrison - Assistant Coach of Boston Celtics, 2017+; 2014-15 NBA Developmental League (D-League) Coach of the Year with Maine Red Claws 
 Doug MacLean - NHL General Manager and Coach for the Columbus Blue Jackets and the Head Coach for Florida Panthers; Coach for two NHL All Star games, 1995–97; earlier after playing varsity hockey for the UPEI Panthers became hockey coach for the University of New Brunswick.  Known as "Prince Eddy" because of his affinity for Prince Edward Island
 Al MacAdam - NHL Hockey Player, Stanley Cup Champion 1974, NHL All-Star 1976 & 1977
 Bill MacMillan - NHL Hockey Player, Bronze Medal 1976 Winter Olympics in Grenoble, France
 Joel Ward - NHL Hockey Player, Team Canada 2014 IIHF World Championship in Minsk, Belarus
 Dave Cameron - NHL Coach (2016 Ass't Coach Calgary Flames) and Player (Colorado Rockies and New Jersey Devils)
 Darwin McCutcheon - Hockey player; five years professional in American Hockey League and Int'l Hockey League.  Played one game in NHL for Toronto Maple Leafs
 Gerry Fleming - NHL hockey player for the Montreal Canadiens and American Hockey League for the Fredericton Canadiens
 Jim Foley - CFL Football Player, Grey Cup Champion 1973 & 1976, CFL's Rookie of the Year Award in 1971 and later won 1975 Most Outstanding Canadian Award
 Vernon Pahl - CFL Football Player, Grey Cup Champion 1984 & 1988
 Erin Carmody - Curler, MVP 2010 Scotties Tournament of Hearts
 Paul Craig - NASL Soccer Player, FC Edmonton
 Kara Grant - Modern Pentathlon: Athens Olympics 2004 and Beijing Olympics 2008; Bronze Medalist at Pan American Games in Rio de Janeiro, Brazil 2002
 Anja Weisser - German Women's Ice Hockey Team, 2014 Olympics in Sochi, Russia
 Park Ye-eun - Korean Women's Ice Hockey Team, 2018 Olympics in Pyeongchang, Korea.
 Katie Baker - Captain Canada National Field Hockey Team; Pan American Games 2007 in Brazil; Commonwealth Games 2010 in Delhi, India.
 Cory Vitarelli - Lacrosse player for Rochester Knighthawks in National Lacrosse League. Three time Champion's Cup now known as (National Lacrosse League Cup) winner.
 Ryan Anstey - soccer player Toronto Lynx USL First Division, Crown Attorney in Alberta
 Jared Gomes - hockey player; Bridgeport Sound Tigers, American Hockey League
 Justin Donati - hockey player; Brampton Beast, ECHL; Toronto St. Michael's Majors, Ontario Hockey League
 Calvin Tyler Scott - professional basketball player in the National Basketball League of Canada for the Island Storm
 Mitch Murphy - Standardbred Canada Board of Directors (horse racing); MLA
 Mathew Maione - professional hockey player for Dinamo Riga in the Kontinental Hockey League, Russia
 Mark Guggenberger - professional ice hockey goaltender with the Perth Thunder of the Australian Ice Hockey League (AIHL)

Honorary degrees
Following is a partial list of Past Honorary Degree Recipients from UPEI:
 Prince Edward, Duke of Edinburgh - Honorary Doctor of Laws, 2007;  third son of Queen Elizabeth II and Prince Philip, Duke of Edinburgh
 Ted Kennedy - Honorary Doctor of Laws from Saint Dunstan's University and SDU Class of 1964 Commencement Speaker
 Angèle Arsenault - Honorary Doctor of Laws from UPEI; actress and singer; Ordre de la Pléiade de l'Association des parlementaires de langue française
 Hisako, Princess Takamado - Member of Imperial House of Japan
 Anne Murray - Singer: four time Grammy Award winner most famously for the 1970 song Snowbird (song), former H.S. teacher on PEI
 Adrienne Clarkson - 26th Governor-General of Canada
 David Suzuki - Climate change activist; Ph.D. from University of Chicago in zoology
 Colonel George Stanley - Professor Emeritus Royal Military College; Knight of Justice of the Order of St. John; Lt. Governor of New Brunswick
 Edward D. Ives - Folklorist of Maine and Canada's Maritime Provinces; Professor of Folklore at University of Maine; Ph.D. from Indiana University
 Philip Oland - of the founding family of and CEO of Moosehead Breweries, Saint John, New Brunswick; Retired Brigadier Canadian Forces; Philanthropist
 Alan Lund - Dancer and choreographer of television, movies, and theatre; Officer of the Order of Canada
 Gordon Pinsent - Screenwriter, Actor: Wind at My Back, Red Green Show, Old Man and the Sea {1999} voice
 Lester B. Pearson - Prime Minister of Canada; Awarded in 1967 at Prince of Wales College
 Pierre Burton - Journalist, historian and author; Queen Elizabeth II Golden Jubilee Medal honoree
 Beverley McLachlin - 17th Chief Justice of Canada; Judge on the Hong Kong Court of Final Appeal
 Doug Hall - Lecturer, author, TV and radio host and chemical engineer by education. Master Marketing Inventor at Procter & Gamble 
 Stompin' Tom Connors - Canadian country and folksinger/writer.  Ranked 13th on The Greatest Canadian list, the highest of any artist
 Art Linkletter - Canadian-born American radio & television personality, "Kids Say the Darndest Things"

Notable UPEI faculty and administration
 Angus Bernard MacEachern - Founded St. Andrew's College; 1st Bishop of Charlottetown (incl Magdalen Islands); studied theology in Spain.
 Bernard Donald Macdonald - 2nd Bishop of Charlottetown; Supervisor of construction of Saint Dunstan's College
 Wade MacLauchlan - 32nd Premier of PEI, President UPEI; grad University of New Brunswick and Yale University with Masters of Law
 William E. Andrew - Chancellor UPEI
 Ronald James Baker - 1st president of UPEI; British Air Force WW II;  Queen Elizabeth II Diamond Jubilee Medal; grad University of British Columbia and School of Oriental and African Studies at the University of London
 Lou Hooper - Professor of Music from 1975; jazz pianist in Harlem, Yew York, Michigan, and Canada. Played with Billie Holiday and Paul Robeson; Taught piano to Oscar Peterson, 1936–39
 Dave Nutbrown - Varsity basketball coach; conference all-star player at University of New Brunswick; recruit of New York Knicks
 Gustave Gingras - Chancellor of UPEI, 1974–82.  Physician; Consultant to United Nations, World Health Organization, and Canadian Red Cross
 George Wastie Deblois - Merchant; MLA; Trustee of Prince of Wales College; Land agent for Samuel Cunard, founder of the Cunard Line of ships
 Richard Raiswell - Historian and Professor of Medieval and Renaissance History; commentator on Smithsonian Network's "Treasures Decoded;" Cricket enthusiast and writer about the sport
 Kenneth Ozmon - Professor and Dean of Arts; Officer of the Order of Canada; later 13th President of Mount Allison University
 Godfrey Baldacchino - UNESCO Co-chair in Island Studies and Sustainability at UPEI (in partnership with the University of Malta)
 Doris Anderson - Chancellor of UPEI, 1992-96: editor Chatelaine magazine; Member of Trilateral Commission; Companion of the Order of Canada; President of the National Action Committee on the Status of Women 
 Paul Boutilier - Instructor of International Marketing; Member of the 1983 Stanley Cup champion New York Islanders and seven year NHL player
 David Bourque - Associate Professor of Music (Spring 2008 term); teacher of clarinet and bass clarinet; member of Toronto Symphony Orchestra; accompanist in several US films, e.g., Academy Award-winning Norman Jewison's film "Moonstruck"
 Reginald C. Stuart - History Professor at UPEI, 1968–88.  Distinguished Chair in North American Studies at the Woodrow Wilson Institute Center for Scholars in Washington, DC, Jun-Jan, 2005
 Jamie Muir - Instructor of Education; Ph.D. in education from University of Virginia; also an MLA in Nova Scotia
 David Staines - Professor of English; Scholar in Medieval, Victorian, and Canadian literature; grad of Harvard University (M.A. and Ph.D.)
 Louis Groarke - Professor of Philosophy; Writings in Ethics, Logic, Political Philosophy, and Aesthetics 
 Anne Simpson - Author and poet; author of seven books, four of which are in the Toronto Globe & Mails Top 100 Books of the Year, i.e., "Falling" (2008) and "Canterbury Beach" (2001) (Short term Writer-in-Residence)
 Vianne Timmons - Professor at UPEI; President of the University of Regina (Alberta)
 Edward MacDonald - Associate Professor of History, teaching about Canadian political history, Atlantic Canada and Prince Edward Island
 Colm Magner - Canadian actor, director and writer
 Richard Covey -  Canadian composer and Assistant Professor of Theory/Composition 
 Ian Dowbiggin -  Professor in the Department of History and writer on the history of medicine.  Fellow of the Royal Society of Canada.
 Paul Boutilier - Instructor of International Marketing; Retired professional ice hockey defenceman who was a member of the 1983 Stanley Cup champion New York Islanders.
 Silver Donald Cameron - Writer-in-Residence; writing focuses on social justice, nature and the environment
 Sam Gindin - Intellectual and activist known for his expertise on the labour movement and the economics of the automobile industry
 Hilda Woolnough - Artist who exhibited in Europe, Asia, the Caribbean and North America; member of Royal Canadian Academy of Arts
 Robyn MacPhee - Virology technologist at the Atlantic Veterinary College, UPEI; Gold Medalist 2001 World Junior Curling Championships
 Marcia Anastasia Christoforides - Established the Sir James Dunn Animal Welfare Centre at UPEI with gift of 2.2 million dollars. Wife of Max Aitken, 1st Baron Beaverbrook with honorific as Dowager Lady Beaverbrook.
 Sir Charles Dalton – Silver fox breeder; Owner of the Charlottetown Guardian newspaper; Donated and built Dalton Hall at SDU; Knight Commander in the Order of St. Gregory the Great

See also 
Higher education in Prince Edward Island

References

Histories of the University 
 Bruce, Marian. A Century of Excellence: Prince of Wales College, 1860–1969. Charlottetown: Prince of Wales Alumni Association/Island Studies Press, 2005.
 Bruce, Marian. Pets, Professors, and Politicians: The Founding and Early Years of the Atlantic Veterinary College. Charlottetown: Atlantic Veterinary College/Island Studies Press, 2004.
 MacEachern, Alan. Utopian U: The Founding of the University of Prince Edward Island, 1968–1970. Charlottetown: University of Prince Edward Island, 2005.
 Moase, Lorne Robert. "The Development of the University of Prince Edward Island, 1964-1972." M.Ed., University of New Brunswick, 1972.

External links 
 University of Prince Edward Island
 University Island
 UPEI Student Union

 
Educational institutions established in 1969
Prince Edward Island, University
1969 establishments in Prince Edward Island